Visiting Hours (originally titled The Fright) is a 1982 Canadian psychological slasher film directed by Jean-Claude Lord and starring Lee Grant, Michael Ironside, Linda Purl, William Shatner and Lenore Zann. The plot focuses on a feminist journalist who becomes the target of a serial killer, who follows her to the hospital after attacking her in her home.

Visiting Hours was released on May 28, 1982, and grossed $13.3 million at the box office on a budget of $6 million. The film received mostly negative reviews from critics.

Plot
Deborah Ballin, a feminist activist, inspires the wrath of the misogynistic psychopath and serial killer Colt Hawker on a TV talk show. He attacks her, but she survives and is sent to County General Hospital.

Colt begins stalking her. Deborah befriends the nurse Sheila Munroe, who admires her devotion to women's rights. Colt murders an elderly patient and a nurse. He overhears Sheila's opinions on Deborah and "that bastard" who attacked her. Colt decides to focus his attention on Sheila, stalking her and her children at home.

Colt courts a young girl, Lisa, and then brutally beats and tortures her, despite being unable to rape her. The next day, Deborah discovers that the patient and the nurse have been killed, so she suspects her attacker is back to finish the job. She tries to convince her boss, Gary Baylor, and Sheila that she is not safe, but they both think she is paranoid.

Colt visits his father, who was disfigured years ago when his abused wife fought back and threw hot oil in his face. This event resulted in Colt's hatred of self-defending women. He tries to kill Deborah again but is thwarted by her security. A frantic Sheila is paged and finds Lisa, whose wounds she had treated, waiting for her. Lisa says she knows the identity of Deborah's attacker, and where he lives.

Before she can alert anyone, Sheila receives a phone call from Colt, warning her that he is in her house with her daughter and babysitter. She sends Lisa to warn Deborah, then rushes home and finds her daughter and babysitter safe in bed. She places a call to Deborah, but Colt springs forth to stab Sheila in the stomach and pushes her to the ground. He places the phone to her ear to torture Deborah from hearing her in pain. He moves toward Sheila's daughter. Sheila can only scream in terror as he walks out, leaving her to die.

Colt goes home, where he devises one last plan to kill Deborah. He breaks a beer bottle underneath his arm, wounding himself badly. Gary and Deborah have an ambulance sent to Sheila's house. Still alive, but badly wounded, she is rushed to the hospital. Gary accompanies the police to Colt's apartment, where they discover the photos of his previous victims, as well as Deborah and Sheila's. They also learn that the wounded Hawker has been taken to County General.

Sheila is taken into the emergency room and Colt is wheeled in. After being bandaged and medicated, he sneaks away to find Deborah and attacks her. She flees to an elevator. In the basement, she goes into a radiography room, finding a helpless Sheila, all alone, waiting for X-rays.

Realizing she must lure Colt away to protect Sheila, Deborah leaves and deliberately gives her location away. Colt approaches the curtain she is hiding behind and Deborah stabs him with a switchblade, killing him. Sheila is wheeled to safety while Gary comforts Deborah.

Cast

Production
Filming took place in the fall of 1980 in Montreal, Quebec, Canada, under the working title The Fright. The budget was approximately $6 million. Filming completed in late October 1980.

Release
The film was released theatrically in the United States by 20th Century Fox on May 28, 1982.

Censorship
In the United Kingdom, the film was subject to censorship, and had one minute of footage excised for its theatrical release. It was subsequently classified as a "video nasty" by the British Board of Film Classification (BBFC), though the video print of the film remains the same as the censored theatrical cut.

Critical response
Reviews from critics were very negative. Vincent Canby of The New York Times called the film "an especially clumsy, overwrought example of slash-and-hack melodrama ... The laughs here are not intentional." Variety wrote that the film, "though artless, is terror-crammed and bloody enough to appeal to the raunchy circuit trade." Gene Siskel of the Chicago Tribune gave it half a star out of four and called it "yet another depressing sickie-with-knife-chasing-women picture." He found it "shocking and depressing" that Grant and Shatner appeared in it, asking, "Do these people really need a paycheck that badly?"

Many critics commented on the film's portrayal of violence against women: Kevin Thomas of the Los Angeles Times called the film "just another sickening, numbskull movie that hypocritically exploits extreme violence against women while purportedly protesting it." The Austin American-Statesmans Patrick Taggart deemed it "mainly a celebration of violence...  there's no warmth here, nor any truly sympathetic characters." Tom Shales of The Washington Post wrote, "You're not just sorry you came to a movie like this; you feel saddened and troubled that it even exists, that somebody saw a few more quick bucks in such a tired, ritualized and malicious formula."

Geoff Brown of The Monthly Film Bulletin called it a "lamentable shocker," with the writer and director "charging like bulls through a script ridden with implausibilities." Bill Cosford of the  Miami Herald awarded the film a one-star out of four-star rating, citing plot inconsistencies as a major fault.

Film review aggregator Rotten Tomatoes reports an approval rating of 14%, based on 14 reviews, with an average rating of 3.8/10.

Home media
The film was released on DVD by Anchor Bay Entertainment in April 2006. It was re-released by Scream Factory, along with Bad Dreams (1988)—another hospital-set horror film—as a double feature DVD on September 13, 2011, with a Blu-ray edition following on February 18, 2014.

See also
List of films featuring home invasions

References

Sources

External links

1982 films
1982 horror films
1980s feminist films
1980s psychological thriller films
1980s slasher films
Canadian slasher films
English-language Canadian films
Canadian serial killer films
Films about domestic violence
Films directed by Jean-Claude Lord
Films shot in Montreal
Films set in hospitals
Video nasties
1980s English-language films
1980s Canadian films